John May Parsons (September 21, 1866 – May 11, 1946) was an American Republican politician who served three terms in the Senate of Virginia.

References

External links
 
 

1866 births
1946 deaths
Republican Party Virginia state senators
People from Grayson County, Virginia
20th-century American politicians